A political campaign is an organized effort which seeks to influence the decision making progress within a specific group. In democracies, political campaigns often refer to electoral campaigns, by which representatives are chosen or referendums are decided. In modern politics, the most high-profile political campaigns are focused on general elections and candidates for head of state or head of government, often a president or prime minister.

Campaign message

The message of the campaign contains the ideas that the candidate wants to share with the voters.
It is to get those who agree with their ideas to support them when running for a political position.
The message often consists of several talking points about policy issues.
The points summarize the main ideas of the campaign and are repeated frequently in order to create a lasting impression with the voters. In many elections, the opposition party will try to get the candidate "off message" by bringing up policy or personal questions that are not related to the talking points. Most campaigns prefer to keep the message broad in order to attract the most potential voters.  A message that is too narrow can alienate voters or slow the candidate down with explaining details.
For example, in the 2008 American presidential election John McCain originally used a message that focused on his patriotism and political experience: "Country First"; later the message was changed to shift attention to his role as "The Original Maverick" within the political establishment. Barack Obama ran on a consistent, simple message of "change" throughout his campaign.

Campaign finance

Fundraising techniques include having the candidate call or meet with large donors, sending direct mail pleas to small donors, and courting interest groups who could end up spending millions on the race if it is significant to their interests.

Organization

In a modern political campaign, the campaign organization (or "machine") will have a coherent structure of personnel in the same manner as any business of similar size.

Campaign manager
A Campaign Manager’s primary duty is to ensure marketing campaigns achieve their objectives. They work with the Marketing Manager to create, execute and monitor the performance of campaigns and provide all the resources required to meet sales targets.

Political consultants

Political consultants advise campaigns on virtually all of their activities, from research to field strategy. Consultants conduct candidate research, voter research, and opposition research for their clients.

Activists
In the context of political campaigns, activists are "foot soldiers" loyal to a campaign's cause. As supporters, they promote the campaign as volunteer activists. Such volunteers and interns may take part in activities such as canvassing door-to-door and making phone calls on behalf of the campaigns.

Techniques
A campaign team (which may be as small as one inspired individual, or a heavily resourced group of professionals) must consider how to communicate the message of the campaign, recruit volunteers, and raise money. Campaign advertising draws on techniques from commercial advertising and propaganda, also entertainment and public relations, a mixture dubbed politainment. The avenues available to political campaigns when distributing their messages is limited by the law, available resources, and the imagination of the campaigns' participants. These techniques are often combined into a formal strategy known as the campaign plan. The plan takes account of a campaign's goal, message, target audience, and resources available. The campaign will typically seek to identify supporters at the same time as getting its message across.
The modern, open campaign method was pioneered by Aaron Burr during the American presidential election of 1800.

Another modern campaign method by political scientist Joel Bradshaw points out four key propositions for developing a successful campaign strategy. “First, in any election the electorate can be divided into three groups: the candidate's base, the opponent's base, and the undecided. Second, past election results, data from registered voter lists, and survey research make it possible to determine which people fall into each of these three groups. Third, it is neither possible nor necessary to get the support of all people. Fourth, and last, once a campaign has identified how to win, it can act to create the circumstances to bring about this victory. In order to succeed, campaigns should direct campaign resources— money, time, and message— to key groups of potential voters and nowhere else.”

Campaign communication

Election campaign communication refers to party-controlled communication, e.g. campaign advertising, and party-uncontrolled communication, e.g. media coverage of elections.

Campaign advertising

Campaign advertising is the use of paid media (newspapers, radio, television, etc.) to influence the decisions made for and by groups. These ads are designed by political consultants and the campaign's staff.

Media management
Media management refers to the ability of a political campaign to control the message that it broadcasts to the public. The forms of media used in political campaigns can be classified into two distinct categories: "paid media" or "earned media".

Paid media refers to any media attention that is directly generated from spending. This form of media is commonly found through political advertisements and organized events. An advantage of paid media is that it allows political campaigns to tailor the messages they show the public and control when the public sees them. Campaigns often prioritize spending in contested regions and increase their paid media expenses as an election approaches. Electoral campaigns often conclude with a “closing argument ad”, an advertisement that summarizes the campaign’s core themes and explains the candidate’s vision for the future. In the 2020 election, Joe Biden's "Rising" ad starts with him saying "we're in a battle for the soul of this nation" and a worker in Donald Trump's Pennsylvania ad stated "that will be the end of my job and thousands of others" if Trump lost.

Earned media describes free media coverage, often from news stories or social media posts. Unlike paid media, earned media does not incur an expense to the campaign. Earned media does not imply that the political campaign is mentioned in a positive manner. Political campaigns may often receive earned media from gaffes or scandals. In the 2016 United States Presidential Election, a majority of the media coverage surrounding Hillary Clinton was focused on her scandals, with the most prevalent topics being topics related to her emails.

Experts say that effective media management is an essential component of a successful political campaign. Studies show that candidates with higher media attention tend to have greater success in elections. It is also important to note that each form of media can influence the other. Paid media may raise the newsworthiness of an event which could lead to an increase in earned media. Campaigns may also spend money to emphasize stories circulating through media networks. Research suggests that neither form of media is inherently superior. A 2009 study found that media coverage was not significantly more effective than paid advertisements.

Demonstrations

Modern technology and the internet

The internet is now a core element of modern political campaigns. Communication technologies such as e-mail, websites, and podcasts for various forms of activism enable faster communications by citizen movements and deliver a message to a large audience. These Internet technologies are used for cause-related fundraising, lobbying, volunteering, community building, and organizing. Individual political candidates are also using the internet to promote their election campaign. In a study of Norwegian election campaigns, politicians reported they used social media for marketing and for dialogue with voters. Facebook was the primary platform for marketing and Twitter was used for more continuous dialogue.

Signifying the importance of internet political campaigning, Barack Obama's presidential campaign relied heavily on social media, Search Engine Optimisation (SEO) and new media channels to engage voters, recruit campaign volunteers, and raise campaign funds. The campaign brought the spotlight on the importance of using internet in new-age political campaigning by utilizing various forms of social media and new media (including Facebook, YouTube and a custom generated social engine) to reach new target populations. The campaign's social website, my.BarackObama.com, utilized a low cost and efficient method of mobilizing voters and increasing participation among various voter populations. This new media was incredibly successful at reaching the younger population while helping all populations organize and promote action.

High proficiency and effective algorithmic integration will be the core factor in the framework. This technology integration helps campaign information reach a wide audience in split-seconds. This was successfully tested and implemented in the 2015 Aruvikkara election and the 2020 Kerala elections. Marcus Giavanni, social media consultant, blockchain developer and second place opponent in the 2015 Denver mayoral election, was first to file for the 2019 election. Marcus Giavanni used advanced algorithms, artificial intelligence, and voice indexing predictions to box in campaigns.

Husting

A husting, or the hustings, was originally a physical platform from which representatives presented their views or cast votes before a parliamentary or other election body. By metonymy, the term may now refer to any event, such as debates or speeches, during an election campaign where one or more of the representative candidates are present.

Other techniques

Writing directly to members of the public (either via a professional marketing firm or, particularly on a small scale, by volunteers)
By distributing leaflets or selling newspapers
Through websites, online communities, and solicited or unsolicited bulk email
Through a new technique known as microtargeting that helps identify and target small demographic slices of voters
Through a whistlestop tour - a series of brief appearances in several small towns
Hampering the ability of political competitors to campaign, by such techniques as counter-rallies, picketing of rival parties’ meetings, or overwhelming rival candidates' offices with mischievous phone calls (most political parties in representative democracies publicly distance themselves from such disruptive and morale-affecting tactics, with the exception of those parties self-identifying as activist
 Organizing political house parties
 Using endorsements of other celebrated party members to boost support (see coattail effect)
 Using a campaign surrogate - a celebrity or person of influence, campaigning on a candidate's behalf.
 Remaining close to or at home to make speeches to supporters who come to visit as part of a front porch campaign
 Vote-by-mail, previously known as "absentee ballots" have grown significantly in importance as an election tool. Campaigns in most states must have a strategy in place to impact early voting
 Sale of official campaign merchandise (colloquially known as swag, in reference to the baiting technique) as a way of commuting a competitor's popularity into campaign donations, volunteer recruitment, and free advertising

Campaign types

Informational campaign
An informational campaign is a political campaign designed to raise public awareness and support for the positions of a candidate (or her/his party). It is more intense than a paper campaign, which consists of little more than filing the necessary papers to get on the ballot, but is less intense than a competitive campaign, which aims to actually win election to the office. An informational campaign typically focuses on low-cost outreach such as news releases, getting interviewed in the paper, making a brochure for door to door distribution, organizing poll workers, etc.

Paper campaign
A paper campaign is a political campaign in which the candidate only files the necessary paperwork to appear on the ballot. The purpose of such a token effort may be simply to increase name awareness of a minor political party, to give voters of a certain ideology an opportunity to vote accordingly, or to ensure that the party has candidates in every constituency. It can be a cost-effective means of attracting media coverage. An informational campaign, by contrast, may involve news releases, newspaper interviews, door-to-door campaigning, and organizing polls. As the level of seriousness rises, the marginal cost of reaching more people rises accordingly, due to the high cost of TV commercials, paid staff, etc. which are used by competitive campaigns. Paper candidates do not expect to be elected and usually run simply as a way of helping the more general campaign. However, an unexpected surge in support for the party may result in many paper candidates being unexpectedly elected, as for example happened to the New Democratic Party in Quebec during the 2011 federal election.

Effects 
A forthcoming study in the American Political Science Review found that campaigns have "an average effect of zero in general elections". The study found two instances where campaigning was effective: "First, when candidates take unusually unpopular positions and campaigns invest unusually heavily in identifying persuadable voters. Second, when campaigns contact voters long before election day and measure effects immediately — although this early persuasion decays."

One reason why it is hard to judge the effectiveness of an election campaign is because many people know who they want to vote for long before the campaigns are started. Voters are more likely to vote for a nominee based on whose values align closest with theirs. Studies suggest that party flips come from the analysis of how a voter sees their parties performance in the years before a campaign even begins.

Another study suggests that at the 2017 Austrian legislative election, 31% of voters admitted to either developing of changing their party preferences during the election campaign. The study provides data that shows how the main parties within Austria had differing levels of voters flipping toward them, thus proving that an election campaign has some level of effectiveness that differs between parties, depending on factors such as media presence.

Spending 
In presidential campaigns in the United States, research indicates that a $10 million advantage in spending in an individual states leads to approximately 27,000 more votes for the campaign in the state, which can be sufficient to win a close race. In down-ballot races, spending matters more. Scholars have estimated that a $2 million advantage can net a Senate campaign 10,000 votes.

Presidential campaigns 
A large body of political science research emphasizes how "fundamentals" – the state of the economy, whether the country is at war, how long the president's party has held the office, and which candidate is more ideologically moderate – predict presidential election outcomes. However, campaigns may be necessary to enlighten otherwise uninformed voters about the fundamentals, which thus become increasingly predictive of preferences as the campaign progresses. Research suggests that "the 2012 presidential campaigns increased turnout in highly targeted states by 7–8 percentage points, on average, indicating that modern campaigns can significantly alter the size and composition of the voting population".

National conventions 
A consensus in the political science literature holds that national conventions usually have a measurable effect on presidential elections that is relatively resistant to decay.

Presidential and vice-presidential debates 
Research is mixed on the precise impact of debates. Rather than encourage viewers to update their political views in accordance with the most persuasive arguments, viewers instead update their views to merely reflect what their favored candidate is saying.

Presidential primaries 
The fundamentals matter less in the outcome of presidential primaries. One prominent theory holds that the outcome of presidential primaries is largely determined by the preferences of party elites. Presidential primaries are therefore less predictive, as various types of events may impact elites' perception of the viability of candidates. Gaffes, debates and media narratives play a greater role in primaries than in presidential elections.

Strategies 

Traditional ground campaigning and voter contacts remain the most effective strategies. Some research suggests that knocking on doors can increase turnout by as much as 10% and phone calls by as much as 4%. One study suggests that lawn signs increase vote share by 1.7 percentage points. A review of more than 200 get-out-the-vote experiments finds that the most effective tactics are personal: Door-to-door canvassing increases turnout by an average of about 2.5 percentage points; volunteer phone calls raise it by about 1.9 points, compared to 1.0 points for calls from commercial phone banks; automated phone messages are ineffective.  Using out-of-state volunteers for canvassing is less effective in increasing turnout than using local and trained volunteers. 

According to political scientists Donald Green and Alan Gerber, it costs $31 to produce a vote going door to door, $91-$137 to produce a vote by sending out direct mailers, $47 per vote from leafletting, $58-$125 per vote from commercial phone banking, and $20-$35 per vote from voluntary phone banking. A 2018 study in the American Economic Review found that door-to-door canvassing on behalf of the Francois Hollande campaign in the 2012 French presidential election "did not affect turnout, but increased Hollande's vote share in the first round and accounted for one fourth of his victory margin in the second. Visits' impact persisted in later elections, suggesting a lasting persuasion effect." According to a 2018 study, repeated get-out-the-vote phone calls had diminishing effects but each additional phone call increased the probability to vote by 0.6-1.0 percentage points. Another 2018 study found that "party leaflets boost turnout by 4.3 percentage points while canvassing has a small additional effect (0.6 percentage points)" in a United Kingdom election.

A 2016 study found that visits by candidate visits to states have modest effects: "visits are most effective in influencing press coverage at the national level and within battleground states. Visits’ effects on voters themselves, however, are much more modest than consultants often claim, and visits appear to have no effects outside the market that hosts a visit." The authors of the study argue that it would be more effective for campaigns to go to the pockets of the country where wealthy donors are (for fundraising) and hold rallies in the populous states both to attract national press and raise funds. A 2005 study found that campaign visits had no statistically significant effect, after controlling for other factors, on voter turnout in the 1992, 1996, and 2000 elections. On the other hand, a 2017 paper of the 1948 presidential election provides "strong evidence that candidate visits can influence electoral returns". Other research also provides evidence that campaign visits increase vote share.

Campaigns may also rely on strategically placed field offices to acquire votes. The Obama 2008 campaign's extensive use of field offices has been credited as crucial to winning in the states of Indiana and North Carolina. Each field office that the Obama campaign opened in 2012 gave him approximately a 0.3% greater vote share.  According to one study, the cost per vote by having a field office is $49.40. 

According to a 2020 study, campaign spending on messaging to voters affects voter support for candidates. Another 2020 study found that political advertising had small effects regardless of context, message, sender, and receiver. A 2022 study found that voters are persuadable to switch support for candidates when they are exposed to new information.

Political science research generally finds negative advertisement (which has increased over time) to be ineffective both at reducing the support and turnout for the opponent. A 2021 study in the American Political Science Review found that television campaign ads do affect election outcomes, in particular in down-ballot races. According to political scientists Stephen Ansolabehere and Shanto Iyengar, negative ads do succeed at driving down overall turnout though. A 2019 study of online political advertising conducted by a party in the 2016 Berlin state election campaign found that the online-ad campaign "increased the party's vote share by 0.7 percentage points" and that factual ads were more effective than emotional ads.

History

Political campaigns have existed as long as there have been informed citizens to campaign amongst. Democratic societies have regular election campaigns, but political campaigning can occur on particular issues even in non-democracies so long as freedom of expression is allowed. Often mass campaigns are started by the less privileged or anti-establishment viewpoints (as against more powerful interests whose first resort is lobbying). The phenomenon of political campaigns are tightly tied to lobby groups and political parties.

The first modern campaign is often described as William Ewart Gladstone's Midlothian campaign in 1878–80, although there may be earlier recognizably modern examples from the 19th century. The 1896 William McKinley presidential campaign laid the groundwork for modern campaigns.

In the 1790-1820s, the Federalist Party and the Democratic-Republican Party battled it out in the so-called "First Party System". American election campaigns in the 19th century created the first mass-base political parties and invented many of the techniques of mass campaigning.

History of election campaigns in America 
Political campaigns are forever changing and evolving with the growth of technology. In the nineteenth-century candidates were not traveling the country in search of votes. That is until the American presidential race of 1896 when William McKinley recruited the help of Marcus A. Hanna. Hanna devised a plan to have voters come to McKinley. McKinley won the race with 51% of the votes.

The development of new technologies has completely changed the way political campaigns are run. In the late twentieth-century campaigns shifted into television and radio broadcasts. The early 00s brought interactive websites. By 2008 the world of campaigns was available to millions of people through the internet and social media programs. 2008 marks a new era of digital elections because of the fast-paced movement of information.

See also

Techniques and traditions
Canvassing
Election litter
Election promise
Husting
Lawn sign
Sign war
Microtargeting
Permanent campaign
Political campaign staff
Research strategies of election campaign communication research
Robocalls & Personalized audio messaging
Votebank
Assumed Incumbency

General topics
Activism
Civics
Lobbying
Media manipulation
Minimal effects hypothesis
Portal:Politics

References

Sources

World

Barnes, S. H., and M. Kaase Political Action: Mass Participation in Five Western Democracies. Sage, 1979.
Blewett, Neal. The Peers, the Parties and the People: The General Elections of 1910. London: Macmillan, 1972.
Hix, S. The Political System of the European Union. St. Martin's Press, 1999.
Katz, Richard S., and Peter Mair (eds.), How Parties Organize: Change and Adaptation in Party Organizations in Western Democracies. Sage Publications, 1994.

LaPalombara, Joseph and Myron Wiener (eds.), Political Parties and Political Development. Princeton University Press, 1966.
Panebianco, A. Political Parties: Organization and Power. Cambridge University Press, 1988.
Paquette, Laure. Campaign Strategy. New York: Nova, 2006.
Poguntke, Thomas, and Paul Webb, eds. The Presidentialization of Politics: A Comparative Study of Modern Democracies. Oxford University Press. 2005 online
Ware, Alan. Citizens, Parties and the State: A Reappraisal. Princeton University Press, 1987.
Webb, Paul, David Farrell, and Ian Holliday, Political Parties in Advanced Industrial Democracies. Oxford University Press, 2002

United States
 Cunningham, Sean P. Cowboy Conservatism: Texas and the Rise of the Modern Right. Lexington: University Press of Kentucky, 2010.
 Robert J. Dinkin. Campaigning in America: A History of Election Practice. Westport: Greenwood, 1989.
 John Gerring, Party Ideologies in America, 1828–1996. New York: Cambridge University Press, 1998.
 Lewis L. Gould, Grand Old Party: A History of the Republicans. New York: Random House, 2003.
 Gary C. Jacobson. The Politics of Congressional Elections. (5th Edition) New York: Longman, 2000.
 Richard Jensen, The Winning of the Midwest: Social and Political Conflict, 1888–1896. Chicago: University of Chicago Press, 1971.
 L. Sandy Meisel, ed. Political Parties and Elections in the United States: An Encyclopedia. New York: Garland, 1991.
 Arthur M. Schlesinger Jr., ed. History of American Presidential Elections. 4 vols. New York: Chelsea House, 1971.
 James A. Thurber, Campaigns and Elections American Style. New York: Westview Press; 2nd edition, 2004.
 Kirsten A. Foot and Steven M. Schneider, "Web Campaigning". The MIT Press, 2006.
 Bruce A. Bimber and Richard Davis, Campaigning Online: the Internet in U.S. Elections. Oxford University Press, 2003.
 Justin A. Gravely. " Campaigning on American soil and the rules of the American Government". Cambridge University Press, 2014

Further reading 
 Gary C. Jacobson. 2015. How Do Campaigns Matter? The Annual Review of Political Science.

External links

Activism by type